Peroxisome biogenesis factor 10 is a protein that in humans is encoded by the PEX10 gene. Alternative splicing results in two transcript variants encoding different isoforms.

Function 

Peroxisome biogenesis factor 10 is involved in import of peroxisomal matrix proteins. This protein localizes to the peroxisomal membrane.

Clinical significance 

Mutations in this gene result in phenotypes within the Zellweger spectrum of peroxisomal biogenesis disorders, ranging from neonatal adrenoleukodystrophy to Zellweger syndrome.

Interactions 

PEX10 has been shown to interact with PEX12 and PEX19.

References

Further reading

External links
  GeneReviews/NCBI/NIH/UW entry on Peroxisome Biogenesis Disorders, Zellweger Syndrome Spectrum
 OMIM entries on Peroxisome Biogenesis Disorders, Zellweger Syndrome Spectrum